The Tide of Traffic is a 1972 British short documentary film directed by Derek Williams. It was nominated for an Academy Award for Best Documentary Short.

References

External links
Watch The Tide of Traffic at BP Video Library

1972 films
1972 documentary films
1972 short films
British short documentary films
1970s short documentary films
1970s English-language films
1970s British films